Piotr Wojtczak (born 1963, in Lublin) is a Polish diplomat, since 2017 serving as an ambassador to Luxembourg.

Life 
Piotr Wojtczak has graduated from Romance studies and political science at the Maria Curie-Skłodowska University in Lublin. In 1994, he finished also National School of Public Administration. Besides Polish, he speaks English, French and Italian languages.

In 1994 he joined the Ministry of Foreign Affairs (MFA), becoming a specialist on European integration. He was working at the Permanent Representation to the European Union in Brussels, as a member of a team in charge of accession negotiations. Following work on a post of a deputy ambassador to Belgium (2004–2006), in January 2006 he became deputy director of the Department of Europe. Between 2006 and 2007 he was back at the Permanent Representation to the EU, this time as chargé d’affaires. For the next year he was the MFA director general. From 2008 to 2013 he was deputy ambassador and consul-general in Brussels. Following his nomination on ambassador to Luxembourg in January 2017, on 8 February 2017, he presented his diplomatic credentials to Henri, Grand Duke of Luxembourg.

Honours 

 Grand Officer Cross of the Order pro Merito Melitensi

References 

1963 births
Ambassadors of Poland to Luxembourg
Living people
Maria Curie-Skłodowska University alumni
National School of Public Administration (Poland) alumni
People from Lublin
Recipients of the Order pro Merito Melitensi